Before the Acts of Union 1707, the barons of the shire of Elgin and Forres (later called Moray) elected commissioners to represent them in the unicameral Parliament of Scotland and in the Convention of the Estates.

From 1708 Elginshire was represented by one Member of Parliament in the House of Commons of Great Britain.

List of shire commissioners

 1612: Robert Innes of that Ilk
 1639–41, 1648: Sir Robert Innes, 1st Baronet
 1649: Sir Ludovic Gordon, 2nd Baronet
 1661–63: Thomas McKenzie of Plascarden 
 1661–63, 1678 convention: Sir Robert Innes, 2nd Baronet
 1665 convention: Sir Robert Innes of Muirtoun
 1665 convention, 1667 convention: Patrick Dunbar of Belnaferie 
 1669–70: Sir Robert Dunbar of Grangehill
 1669–70: Sir Alexander Douglas of Spynie 
 1678 convention: Sir Robert Innes, the elder, of that Ilk 
 1681–82: Ludovick Grant of Freuquhie 
 1681–82: Sir Thomas Dunbar of Grange 
 1685–86: Sir Alexander Innes, 1st Baronet
 1685–86: James Calder of Muirton
 1689 convention, 1689–1702, 1702–1704: James Brodie of that Ilk 
 1689 convention, 1689–1693: Thomas Dunbar of Grange 
 1696: Sir Robert Gordon, 3rd Baronet
 1698–1702, 1702: Alexander Dunbar of Westfield (sheriff) (died c1702)  
 1703–05: Robert Dunbar of Grangehill (died c.1705)  
 1704–07: Sir Harry Innes, 4th Baronet

References

See also
 Elgin (Parliament of Scotland constituency)
 Forres (Parliament of Scotland constituency)

Constituencies of the Parliament of Scotland (to 1707)
Constituencies disestablished in 1707
1707 disestablishments in Scotland
Elginshire